Damizza Presents... Where I Wanna Be is a compilation album presented by American record producer Damizza. It was released on October 31, 2000 through London Records. Production was handled by Eddie Berkeley, Jermaine Dupri, KayGee, Warren G, and Damizza himself, who also served as executive producer together with co-executive producers Rick Cummings, Shade Sheist and Sujit Kundu. It features contributions from Shade Sheist, Damon Sharpe, Krayzie Bone, TQ, Big Caz, Ja Rule, Kurupt, Layzie Bone, Nate Dogg, Tatum Tots and Damizza. The album peaked at number 143 on the Billboard 200 and number 28 on the Top R&B/Hip-Hop Albums in the United States.

Track listing

Charts

References

External links

2000 compilation albums
Albums produced by KayGee
Albums produced by Damizza
Hip hop compilation albums
Albums produced by Warren G
Albums produced by Jermaine Dupri
London Records compilation albums